Pierre Mollaret (10 July 1898 – 3 December 1987) was a French neurologist who made significant scientific contributions to the study of infectious diseases and neurology. He was born in Auxerre, France. A rare disease characterized by recurrent episodes of aseptic meningitis was discovered by Mollaret and named after him - called Mollaret's meningitis; this disease is typically caused by herpes simplex virus infection of the CNS, and rarely by varicella.
He is also credited with the characterization of a neural pathway known as the Guillain-Mollaret triangle or Myoclonic triangle, and the discovery of the causative agent of cat-scratch disease.

References

French neurologists
1898 births
1987 deaths